The Plaza de César Chávez is an urban plaza and park in Downtown San Jose, California. The plaza's origins date to 1797 as the plaza mayor of the Spanish Pueblo de San José de Guadalupe, making it the oldest public space in Northern California. The plaza was reconsecrated after Californian civil rights activist César Chávez in 1993.

The Plaza de César Chávez is one of San Jose's primary civic spaces and the historic center of Downtown San Jose. It is bounded by numerous San Jose institutions and landmarks, including The Tech Museum of Innovation, the San Jose Museum of Art, City National Civic, and Circle of Palms Plaza. The plaza hosts numerous notable events, including the San Jose Jazz Festival, Music in the Park and Christmas in the Park.

History

The Plaza was established when San Jose moved from its original location on the bank of the Guadalupe River to the current downtown location in 1797 and has been in use ever since, making it the oldest public open space in California.

The present-day park was the site of California's capitol from 1849 to 1851, a period during which the California Republic gained American statehood; hence, the site contained California's first state capitol.  From 1889 to 1958, San Jose's city hall occupied the center of the park  before the local government moved it northward to North First and Mission Streets. Today, San José City Hall is located nearby on Santa Clara Street.

The Fairmont San Jose's main tower was built in 1997, while its annex tower was completed in 2002.

Culture
At different times of the year it hosts live music, cultural festivals, arts and crafts fairs, food shows, the official city Christmas tree, water fountains, and open-air theater.  

The Music in the Park concert series has been held in the park since 1988, except during the 2020 pandemic and in 2011 and 2012, when security issues forced the organizer of the formerly free series to take a break and return as a ticketed event.

The San Jose Jazz Summer Fest has its main stage in the park.

Since 2015, Silicon Valley Pride has been held in the vicinity of the plaza, which had hosted the event in the 1980s as well.

Every winter from Thanksgiving until New Year's it hosts the Christmas in the Park.

At the south end of the plaza is the statue of Quetzalcóatl by Robert Graham.

References

External links

Squares and plazas in San Jose
Parks in San Jose, California
History of San Jose, California